The Simsim caves, also called the Caves of Senmusaimu, are decorated Buddhist caves in the area of Kucha, Tarim Basin, China. Other famous sites nearby are the Ah-ai Grotto, Kizil Caves, the Kizilgaha caves, the Kumtura Caves, and Subashi Temple.

References

External links
 Simsim caves

Sources 
Zhongguo Xinjiang Bihua Quanji 5: Keziergaha Senmusaimu 中国新疆壁画全集 5: 克孜尔尕哈 森木赛姆 [Complete Collection of Xinjiang Murals 5: Keziergaha Senmusaimu Grottoes] 中国壁画全集编辑委员会 Zhongguo Bihua Quanji Bianji Weiyuanhui. Tianjin, 1995;  (Tianjin Renmin Meishu 天津人民美术)
 Peter Hopkirk: Foreign Devils on the Silk Road: The Search for the Lost Cities and Treasures of Chinese Central Asia. The University of Massachusetts Press, Amherst 1980, .
 Zhongguo da baike quanshu: Kaoguxue. Beijing: Zhongguo da baike quanshu chubanshe, 1986

External links
 Turfanforschung
 Grabungen in Sim-Sim (Auf Hellas Spuren in Ostturkistan)
 Auf Hellas Spuren in Ostturkistan: vol.1, S. 109

Caves of Xinjiang
Chinese Buddhist grottoes